Stagg Hall,  is a historic home located at Port Tobacco, Charles County, Maryland, United States. It is a two-story frame house built about 1766 adjacent to Port Tobacco's former town square.  It was built by Thomas Howe Ridgate, a prosperous Port Tobacco merchant.

Stagg Hall was listed on the National Register of Historic Places in 1988.

References

External links
 including undated photo, at Maryland Historical Trust

Houses in Charles County, Maryland
Houses on the National Register of Historic Places in Maryland
Houses completed in 1740
Historic American Buildings Survey in Maryland
National Register of Historic Places in Charles County, Maryland